Aubrey Bryce (born 10 July 1949) is a Guyanese former cyclist. He competed in the sprint and the 1000m time trial at the 1968 Summer Olympics.

References

External links
 

1949 births
Living people
Guyanese male cyclists
Olympic cyclists of Guyana
Cyclists at the 1968 Summer Olympics